The 2001 PBA All-Filipino Cup Finals was the best-of-7 championship series of the 2001 PBA All-Filipino Cup and the conclusion of the conference's playoffs. The San Miguel Beermen and Barangay Ginebra Kings played for the 78th championship contested by the league.
 
San Miguel Beermen captured their 16th PBA title, winning their finals series against the Barangay Ginebra Kings in six games.

Danny Seigle won on his fourth Finals MVP in All-Filipino Cup Finals.

Series scoring summary

Games summary

Game 1

San Miguel shot 47 percent on the floor in the first quarter as against only 21 percent for Barangay Ginebra as the Beermen took a double-digit lead in the first half and never let the Gin Kings get into the groove, they held off their fast-paced game and expected rallies. The Beermen were on top by 14 points, 72–58, with five minutes left in the final period.

Game 2

Danny Ildefonso scored 15 of his career-high 32 points in the third quarter as the Beermen outscored the Gin Kings, 25–14, to take a 68–59 lead at the end of 36 minutes of play.

Game 3

Ronald Magtulis' two offensive rebounds off missed shots by Vergel Meneses and Bal David with less than a minute left in the game preserve the Gin Kings in securing a two-point victory.

Game 4

From a close third quarter, Ginebra suddenly erupted with fastbreak plays and long-range baskets. Danny Seigle was the biggest letdown for the Beermen, shooting 2-of-24 from the floor and 0-of-17 from the outside in San Miguel's worst loss in the conference. Jayjay Helterbrand made 12 of his 14 points while Jun Limpot hit 7 of his 12 points in the fourth quarter.

Game 5

Danny Ildefonso hit two crucial free throws in the final 16.6 seconds in overtime. After Ildefonso's charities, rookie Mark Caguioa, who made a career-high 30 points, had a chance to push the game into second overtime but his three-pointer bounced off the rim as time expired.

Game 6

Danny Seigle, firing from all angles, finished the first half with 19 points. The Beermen took a 50–39 halftime lead and there was no stopping San Miguel from thereon, dominating the boards and pulling away with a flurry of baskets in the third period to open a 19-point spread. The Beermen had their largest lead of 28 points in the fourth quarter at 92–64. Danny Seigle won on his fourth Finals MVP and San Miguel captures won on his championship 16th title.

Rosters

Broadcast notes

References

External links
PBA official website

2001
2001 PBA season
San Miguel Beermen games
Barangay Ginebra San Miguel games
PBA All-Filipino Cup Finals